Thomas Gabriel may refer to:

Sir Thomas Gabriel, 1st Baronet (1811–1891), British timber merchant and Lord Mayor of London
Thomas Gabriel, character in Live Free or Die Hard, played by Timothy Olyphant
Thomas Gabriel (composer) (born 1957), German composer
Thomas Gabriel (missionary) (1837–1875), founder of the Canadian Baptist Mission in India
Thomas Gabriel (country singer) (born 1973), American singer and songwriter

See also